Bruno Hasbrouck Zimm (October 31, 1920 – November 26, 2005) was an American chemist.  He was a professor of chemistry and biochemistry from University of California, San Diego, and a leading polymer chemist and DNA researcher.

Early life
Zimm was born an only child in 1920 in Woodstock, New York. His father was the sculptor Bruno Louis Zimm, and his mother a writer. Zimm graduated from Kent School in Kent, Connecticut in 1938. After obtaining his Ph.D. in physical chemistry under the tutelage of Joe Mayer at Columbia University in 1944, he moved across town for postdoctoral work with Herman Mark at the Polytechnic Institute of Brooklyn, where he began his research on light scattering.

Career

Research 
In 1956, Zimm extended the Rouse model of Polymer Physics to include hydrodynamic interactions mediated by the solvent between different parts of the chain. Whilst the original Rouse model overestimates the decrease of the diffusion coefficient D with the number of polymer beads N as 1/N, the Zimm model predicts D~1/Nν which is consistent with the experimental data for dilute polymer solutions, and where ν is the Flory exponent, a measure of the polymer solubility.

In 1959, together with J.K. Bragg, Zimm wrote a classic paper on the helix-coil transition for polypeptides;  a year later he published a second paper on the “melting” of the helical forms of DNA.

See also
Zimm–Bragg model

References

External links 
 Bruno Zimm Papers MSS 675. Special Collections & Archives, UC San Diego Library.

1920 births
2005 deaths
20th-century American chemists
Columbia Graduate School of Arts and Sciences alumni
Kent School alumni
University of California, San Diego faculty
Members of the United States National Academy of Sciences
Polymer scientists and engineers
Fellows of the American Physical Society